Nongcun Guangbo is a radio station in Heilongjiang province of the People's Republic of China, broadcasting at 1020 AM.

External links
 Heilongjiang PBS Rural Radio new on 945 kHz
 Official website

Radio stations in China
Mass media in Harbin